The Shire of Trayning is a local government area in Western Australia. It was established on 30 June 1911 as the Korrelocking Road District, with a chairman as its head. It was renamed several times as a road district. With the passage of the Local Government Act 1960, it became the Shire of Trayning-Kununoppin-Yelbeni, with a shire president as its head. It was renamed to its present name on 10 September 1965.

Road district chairmen

Shire presidents

References

Lists of local government leaders in Western Australia
Shire of Trayning